The Dr. M.C. Hawkins House is a historic house at 4684 Arkansas Highway 8 in Parkdale, Arkansas.  Built 1911–12, it is an excellent example of a Prairie School house designed by Little Rock architect Frank W. Gibb.  It is a two-story structure faced in brick veneer, laid out in a T shape.  The rectangular main block has a hip roof, while the kitchen wing, which extends to the rear, has a gabled roof.  The main entrance is centered on the front facade, and is sheltered by a porch supported by brick columns and pilasters.  The top of this porch functions as a deck, surrounded by brick posts and a simple wooden balustrade, which was originally a more complex jigsawn design.

The house was listed on the National Register of Historic Places in 1996.

See also
National Register of Historic Places listings in Ashley County, Arkansas

References

Houses on the National Register of Historic Places in Arkansas
Prairie School architecture in Arkansas
Houses completed in 1912
Houses in Ashley County, Arkansas
1912 establishments in Arkansas
National Register of Historic Places in Ashley County, Arkansas